is a Korean baseball player from Ukyō-ku, Kyoto, Japan. He plays as an outfielder for the Hanshin Tigers of the Central League.

Biography
A second-generation Zainichi Korean, Hiyama graduated from Heian High School and entered Toyo University. He played in the Tohto University Baseball League, and got 83 hits (13 home runs) in 261 at bats (batting average: .318), and batted in 45 runs.

He was drafted by the Hanshin Tigers in 1991, and through 2011 season, his statistics are 1240 hits (including 159 home runs) in 4754 at bats (average: .261), and 688 RBIs (:ja:桧山進次郎).

References

External links
Baseball Reference

1969 births
Living people
Zainichi Korean people
Baseball people from Kyoto
Toyo University alumni
Japanese baseball players
Nippon Professional Baseball outfielders
Hanshin Tigers players